Mount Dana is a mountain in the U.S. state of California. Its summit marks the eastern boundary of Yosemite National Park and the western boundary of the Ansel Adams Wilderness. Mount Dana is the highest peak in Yosemite that is a simple hike to the summit. The mountain is named in honor of James Dwight Dana, who was a professor of natural history and geology at Yale.

Mount Dana is composed of prebatholithic rock that is mostly reddish metamorphic rock, which was composed by metavolcanics of surfacing magma from the Mesozoic Era.

Mount Dana's northern face includes a small, receding glacier known as the Dana Glacier. The Dana Meadows lie at the foot of the mountain. From the top, lakes throughout Dana Meadows, Mono Lake, Tioga Peak and many other mountains are in view.

Hike
From the Tioga Pass Road there are many easy routes., available that lead to the summit along the mountain's western or southern slopes. The trail is not frequently maintained.

There is a clearly marked path leading just above tree line. After topping a ridge, a set of use-paths and ducked routes are present, with the main path running along the easterly ridgeline. Additionally, numerous alternate trail segments begin and end at various points on the southwestern face, making parts of this hike a difficult class 2. The path segments turn into scree toward the summit, where a shallow stone-walled shelter and register are found. Significant snow fields on the mountain slopes can exist late into the summer season. Total round trip hiking time can be anywhere between 3 and 12 hours depending many factors, such as acclimatization to elevation.

After reaching a plateau above the tree line, almost all vegetation disappears with the exception of lichen and a few high alpine Sky Pilot (Polemonium eximium).  Fauna are largely limited to spiders and insects, such as black/brown grasshoppers. The only mammals other than humans are marmots and American Pikas which are lagomorphs related to rabbits.

Thunderstorms are known to arise suddenly, making the rocks slippery, and the hiking dangerous year round.

Even experienced hikers can face altitude sickness, due to the high elevation.

In the summer of 2009, an NPS employee died after falling on a technical rock climbing route on the northeast face of Mount Dana.

References

External links 

 

Mountains of Yosemite National Park
Mountains of the Ansel Adams Wilderness
Mountains of Mono County, California
Mountains of Tuolumne County, California
Mountains of Northern California